Nindirí is a town and a  municipality in the Masaya department of Nicaragua.

In 2021 the population was 60,558 in the municipality, and 28,969 in the city. Nindirí is located 3.5 km from downtown Masaya and form the southeastern part of Managua Metropolitan Area.

References 

Populated places in Nicaragua
Municipalities of the Masaya Department